Pixlr is a cloud-based set of image editing tools and utilities, including a number of photo editors and a photo sharing service. It was acquired by Autodesk in 2011. The suite is intended from the range of simple to advanced photo editing. It features three subscription plans which include Free, Premium and Creative Pack.

The platform can be used on desktop and also smartphones and tablets. Pixlr is compatible with various image formats such as JPEG, PNG, WEBP, GIF, PSD (Photoshop Document) and PXZ (native Pixlr document format).

The platform introduced more features in December 2021 with a new logo and added tools which include; Brushes, Heal tool, Animation, and Batch upload. The brush feature enables the creation of hand-drawn effects. The Heal tool allows users to remove unwanted objects from their images whereas the Animation feature can be used to include movements into their edits. Users can also utilize Batch upload to edit up to 50 images simultaneously.

History 
Pixlr was founded in 2008 by Ola Sevandersson, a Swedish developer. On 19 July 2011, Autodesk announced that they had acquired the Pixlr suite. In 2013, Time listed Pixlr as one of the top 50 websites of the year. 123RF acquired Autodesk Pixlr for an undisclosed agreement on 24 April 2017 and Sevandersson joined the company.

News

The platform rebranded itself in 2019 by introducing Pixlr X, Pixlr E and Pixlr M. In February 2023, Pixlr unveils the latest version of its flagship suite of products, Pixlr Suite 2023. With an array of new features, Pixlr Suite 2023 serves a new user interface that is intuitive and easy to navigate, offering its AI-powered tools that appeal to both amateur and professional creatives.

References

Cloud applications
Editing software
Graphics software
Android (operating system) software
IOS software
Windows Phone software